Vladimirovka, Azerbaijan may refer to:
Vladimirovka, Oghuz
Vladimirovka, Quba
Vladimirovka, Sabirabad